Moacyr Siqueira de Queiroz (18 December 1902 – 14 August 1992), known as Russinho, was a Brazilian football player. He has played for Brazil national football team at the 1930 FIFA World Cup finals.

He played club football for Andarahy, Vasco da Gama and Botafogo, winning the Campeonato Carioca in 1924, 1929 and 1934 with Vasco da Gama and in 1935 with Botafogo.

Honours

Club
 Campeonato Carioca (4): 
Vasco da Gama: 1924, 1929, 1934
Botafogo: 1935

Individual
 Campeonato Carioca topscorer (3): 
1924 (14 goal), 1929 (23 goal), 1931 (17 goal)

References

External links

1902 births
1992 deaths
Footballers from Rio de Janeiro (city)
Brazilian footballers
Brazil international footballers
1930 FIFA World Cup players
Botafogo de Futebol e Regatas players
CR Vasco da Gama players
Association football midfielders